Trenton Lavar Hassell (born March 4, 1979) is an American former professional basketball forward. A ,  guard-forward, Hassell was selected by the Chicago Bulls with the 30th overall pick of the 2001 NBA draft.

Early life and college career
Hassell graduated from Clarksville High School in Clarksville, Tennessee, in 1997 and from Austin Peay State University in 2001 with a degree in health and human performance. Among his high school teammates was future NBA player Shawn Marion. Hassell played three seasons of college basketball with the Austin Peay Governors after redshirting his first year. In January 2002, Austin Peay retired Hassell's college jersey number 44.

Professional playing career
During Hassell's rookie season with the Chicago Bulls in 2001–02, he appeared in 78 games, making 47 starts and averaging 8.7 points, 3.3 rebounds and 2.2 assists per game. In Hassell's sophomore season in Chicago, he appeared in all 82 games, making 53 starts and averaging 4.2 point, 3.1 rebounds and 1.8 assists in 24.4 minutes per game.

Hassell was waived by the Bulls on October 23, 2003, and signed by the Minnesota Timberwolves six days later. He was a regular starter with the Wolves and often took the role of defensive specialist, helping the Wolves make the franchise's first appearance in the NBA Western Conference Finals in his first season with the team. Hassell played four seasons in Minnesota, until he was traded to the Dallas Mavericks for Greg Buckner on September 28, 2007.

On February 19, 2008, Hassell was traded from Dallas to the New Jersey Nets along with signed and traded Keith Van Horn, Devin Harris, DeSagana Diop, Maurice Ager, $3 million cash and 2008 and 2010 first round draft picks in exchange for Jason Kidd, Malik Allen and Antoine Wright.

Hassell's final NBA game was played on March 24, 2010, in a 93–79 win over the Sacramento Kings. In his final game, Hassell played for 4 minutes and did not record a single stat.

Hassell joined the Clarksville Cavaliers of the American Basketball Association (ABA) in 2011.

NBA career statistics

Regular season

|-
| style="text-align:left;"|
| style="text-align:left;"|Chicago
| 78 || 47 || 28.7 || .425 || .364 || .763 || 3.3 || 2.2 || .7 || .6 || 8.7
|-
| style="text-align:left;"|
| style="text-align:left;"|Chicago
| 82 || 53 || 24.4 || .367 || .325 || .745 || 3.1 || 1.8 || .6 || .7 || 4.2
|-
| style="text-align:left;"|
| style="text-align:left;"|Minnesota
| 81 || 74 || 28.0 || .465 || .308 || .787 || 3.2 || 1.6 || .4 || .7 || 5.0
|-
| style="text-align:left;"|
| style="text-align:left;"|Minnesota
| 82 || 51 || 25.2 || .474 || .091 || .789 || 2.7 || 1.6 || .4 || .4 || 6.6
|-
| style="text-align:left;"|
| style="text-align:left;"|Minnesota
| 77 || 67 || 32.6 || .464 || .304 || .744 || 2.8 || 2.6 || .6 || .4 || 9.2
|-
| style="text-align:left;"|
| style="text-align:left;"|Minnesota
| 76 || 68 || 29.3 || .490 || .240 || .783 || 3.2 || 2.7 || .3 || .3 || 6.7
|-
| style="text-align:left;"|
| style="text-align:left;"|Dallas
| 37 || 6 || 12.5 || .463 || .250 || .500 || 1.2 || .7 || .2 || .0 || 2.1
|-
| style="text-align:left;"|
| style="text-align:left;"|New Jersey
| 26 || 0 || 11.9 || .364 || .200 || .750 || 1.5 || .6 || .2 || .1 || 1.8
|-
| style="text-align:left;"|
| style="text-align:left;"|New Jersey
| 53 || 31 || 20.6 || .450 || .250 || .800 || 2.8 || 1.0 || .4 || .3 || 3.7
|-
| style="text-align:left;"|
| style="text-align:left;"|New Jersey
| 52 || 31 || 21.3 || .411 || .000 || .754 || 2.9 || 1.0 || .3 || .2 || 4.5
|- class="sortbottom"
| style="text-align:center;" colspan="2"|Career
| 644 || 428 || 25.3 || .445 || .318 || .765 || 2.8 || 1.8 || .4 || .4 || 5.8

Playoffs

|-
| style="text-align:left;"|2004
| style="text-align:left;"|Minnesota
| 18 || 18 || 26.2 || .521 || .500 || .813 || 2.4 || 1.5 || .6 || .4 || 7.7
|- class="sortbottom"
| style="text-align:center;" colspan="2"|Career
| 18 || 18 || 26.2 || .521 || .500 || .813 || 2.4 || 1.5 || .6 || .4 || 7.7

References

External links

 Biography from 2009-10 New Jersey Nets media guide

1979 births
Living people
21st-century African-American sportspeople
African-American basketball players
American men's basketball players
Austin Peay Governors men's basketball players
Basketball players from Tennessee
Chicago Bulls draft picks
Chicago Bulls players
Dallas Mavericks players
Minnesota Timberwolves players
New Jersey Nets players
People from Clarksville, Tennessee
Shooting guards
20th-century African-American sportspeople